I.S.P.M.V.: Tethys is a role-playing game supplement for Traveller published by FASA vin 1980.

Contents
I.S.P.M.V.: Tethys is a book containing plans for the Tethys, a 1000-ton "Interstellar Para-Military" Q-ship that carries six pinnaces and a squadron of troopers.  The supplement is based on the spaceship creation rules originally published in Traveller Book 5: High Guard.

In addition to the rulebook, the supplement includes seven pages of 8" x 16" blueprints in 15 mm scale for the Tethys, and a sheet of additional descriptions.

Publication history
I.S.P.M.V.: Tethys was written by Jordan Weisman and was published in 1981 by FASA as a pamphlet, and seven 11" x 17" map sheets.

Reception
In the June 1981 edition of The Space Gamer (Issue No. 40), Richard A. Edwards found the supplement lacking. "Tethys seems incomplete. Perhaps, with a lot of work, it could be usable for miniature play or to provide a platform for a shoot-out in space. You'd probably be better off saving up for Azhanti High Lightning."

In the July 1981 edition of Dragon (Issue #51), Tony Watson also questioned the value of the supplement for referees who enjoyed creating their own work: "If the referee is conversant in constructing vessels that the players enjoy and has a sufficiency of such ships, then he probably should not buy these playing aids. But if for any reason he finds new ships attractive, these are good candidates."

Reviews
Different Worlds #18 (Jan., 1982)

References

Role-playing game supplements introduced in 1980
Traveller (role-playing game) supplements